Trimezia martinicensis is a species of bulbous plant in the family Iridaceae. Originally from South America and the West Indies, it is now widely naturalized throughout the tropics. Common names include Martinique trimezia, yellow walking iris and forenoon yellow flag.

Distinction from Trimezia steyermarkii
Trimezia martinicensis  is closely related to T. steyermarkii, with which it has been widely confused. Clive Innes describes T. martinicensis as having a brown mark at the base of each outer tepal, whereas T. steyermarkii has brownish-purple bands. In Kubitzki & Huber (1998), the flowers of T. martinicensis are shown as opening less widely than those of T. steyermarkii. The inner tepals of both species are S-shaped in cross-section; those of T. martinicensis are more-or-less upright (Innes describes them as "folded inwards"), whereas those of T. steyermarkii bend outwards into a more elongated shape so that the top of the S is not visible from above.

References

martinicensis
Flora of the Caribbean
Flora of South America
Plants described in 1962
Flora without expected TNC conservation status